7-a-side football at the 2006 FESPIC Games were held 25 – 30 November 2006. There was 1 gold medals in this sport.

Participating teams and officials

Qualifying
A total of five teams will qualify to compete in the football five a side competition. The host nation (Malaysia) automatically qualifies a team. A team may consist of a maximum of 14 athletes.

Squads
The individual teams contact following football gamblers on to:

Group A

Group A

Venues
The venues to be used for the World Championships were located in Kuala Lumpur.

Format

The first round, or group stage, was a competition between the 6 teams in two group, where engaged in a round-robin tournament within itself. The two best placed teams of each group play in the semifinals for the final. The third-place teams play the fifth place of the tournament.

Classification
Athletes with a physical disability competed. The athlete's disability was caused by a non-progressive brain damage that affects motor control, such as cerebral palsy, traumatic brain injury or stroke. Athletes must be ambulant.

Players were classified by level of disability.
C5: Athletes with difficulties when walking and running, but not in standing or when kicking the ball.
C6: Athletes with control and co-ordination problems of their upper limbs, especially when running.
C7: Athletes with hemiplegia.
C8: Athletes with minimal disability; must meet eligibility criteria and have an impairment that has impact on the sport of football.

Teams must field at least one class C5 or C6 player at all times. No more than two players of class C8 are permitted to play at the same time.

Group stage
In the first group stage have seen the teams in a two group of three teams.

Group A

Group B

Knockout stage

Semi-finals

Finals

Position 5-6

Position 3-4

Final

Statistics

Ranking

See also

References

External links
Football 7-a-side at 2006 FESPIC Games, Kuala Lumpor from 4 March 2006
Cerebral Palsy International Sports & Recreation Association (CPISRA)
International Federation of Cerebral Palsy Football (IFCPF)

2006 FESPIC Games
2006